The Commission on Elections, abbreviated as , is one of the three constitutional commissions of the Philippines. Its principal role is to enforce all laws and regulations relative to the conduct of elections in the Philippines.

The other two Constitutional Commissions are the Commission on Audit and Civil Service Commission

Functions
According to Article IX-C, Section 2 of the 1987 Constitution of the Philippines, the Commission on Elections (COMELEC) shall exercise the following powers and functions:
 Enforce and administer all laws and regulations relative to the conduct of an election, plebiscite, initiative, referendum, and recall.
 Exercise exclusive original jurisdiction over all contests relating to the elections, returns, and qualifications of all elective regional, provincial, and city officials, and appellate jurisdiction over all contests involving elective municipal officials decided by trial courts of general jurisdiction, or involving elective barangay officials decided by trial courts of limited jurisdiction. Decisions, final orders, or rulings of the commission on election contests involving elective municipal and barangay offices shall be final, executory, and not appealable.
 Decide, except those involving the right to vote, all questions affecting elections, including determination of the number and location of polling places, appointment of election officials and inspectors, and registration of voters.
 Deputize, with the concurrence of the President, law enforcement agencies and instrumentalities of the Government, including the Armed Forces of the Philippines, for the exclusive purpose of ensuring free, orderly, honest, peaceful, and credible elections.
 Register, after sufficient publication, political parties, organizations, or coalitions which, in addition to other requirements, must present their platform or program of government; and accredit citizens’ arms of the Commission on Elections. Religious denominations and sects shall not be registered. Those which seek to achieve their goals through violence or unlawful means, or refuse to uphold and adhere to this Constitution, or which are supported by any foreign government shall likewise be refused registration. Financial contributions from foreign governments and their agencies to political parties, organizations, coalitions, or candidates related to elections constitute interference in national affairs, and, when accepted, shall be an additional ground for the cancellation of their registration with the commission, in addition to other penalties that may be prescribed by law.
 File, upon a verified complaint, or on its own initiative, petitions in court for inclusion or exclusion of voters; investigate and, where appropriate, prosecute cases of violations of election laws, including acts or omissions constituting election frauds, offenses, and malpractices.
 Recommend to the Congress effective measures to minimize election spending, including limitation of places where propaganda materials shall be posted, and to prevent and penalize all forms of election frauds, offenses, malpractices, and nuisance candidacies.
 Recommend to the President the removal of any officer or employee it has deputized, or the imposition of any other disciplinary action, for violation or disregard of, or disobedience to its directive, order, or decision.
 Submit to the President and the Congress a comprehensive report on the conduct of each election, plebiscite, initiative, referendum, or recall.

History

Predecessor

The Executive Bureau
The  was created by a 1940 amendment to the 1935 Constitution of the Philippines. The secretary of interior saw to it that local authorities performed the ministerial duties assigned to them by the Election Code. He decided administrative questions concerning elections. The courts, however, exercised exclusive and final jurisdiction over questions affecting the right to vote as well as contested elections of local elective officials. Elections contests involving members of the National Assembly were judged solely by an electoral commission composed of three justices of the Supreme Court and six members of the National Assembly.

A statutory commission
In view, however, of the close official ties between the president and the secretary of interior, there was always the danger of a partisan secretary of the interior exploiting his powers and influence to ensure the victory of his party at the polls. As a consequence, the constitution was amended in 1940 to create an independent Commission on Elections, composed of a chairman and two other members, to take over the functions of the secretary of the interior relative to the elections. but since the amendments could not be effective in time for the 1940 elections, the National Assembly, by Commonwealth Act No. 607, created a Commission on Elections, giving thereto the same powers which the Commission on Elections could have under the amended constitution. The statutory commission supervised the conduct of the December 10, 1940, local Philippine elections.

Creation of the Commission
The constitutional amendment creating the Commission on Elections was finally approved on December 2, 1940. On June 21, 1941, Commonwealth Act No. 657 was enacted reorganizing the Commission on Elections as a constitutional entity. The members of the statutory commission continued as members of the constitutional commission.

The chairman and members of the commission had a fixed term of nine years each – a member being replaced every three years except in the first commission. They could be removed from office only by impeachment. They were provided with fixed salaries which could neither be increased nor diminished during their term of office. These were safeguards to ensure the independence of the commission.

The administrative control of elections exercised by the secretary of interior was transferred to the Commission on Elections. The commission was vested with the exclusive charge of enforcing and administering all laws relative to elections and power to decide all questions affecting elections, except those involving the right to vote, which were left to final judicial determination. The courts and electoral tribunals retained their original powers over election contests.

Membership expansion
The 1973 Constitution enlarged the membership of the commission from three to nine members but reduced their term of office from nine years to seven years. As in the 1935 Constitution, the chairman and commissioners have staggered terms of office and could be removed from office only by impeachment.

First to serve in the Commission on Elections under the 1973 Constitution were former Senator Leonardo B. Perez, as chairman, and Venacio S. Duque, Flores A. Bayot, Jose M. Mendoza, Fernando R. Veloso, Lininding Pangandaman, Venancio L. Yaneza and Casimiro R. Madarang Jr. as commissioners. His unexpired term was taken over by Commissioner Hashim R. Abubakar.

On May 17, 1980, Chairman Perez (who was later appointed minister on political affairs by President Marcos) and Commissioners Duque and Bayot, after completing their seven-years term, retired. Commissioner Santiago succeeded Perez, and the following were appointed commissioners: Domingo C. Pabalete; Victorino A. Savellano; Jaime C. Opinion; Noli Sagadraca; Romeo Firme: Luis Lardizabal and Ide C. Tillah. With Commissioner Lardizabal the membership of the commission was thus increased to eight, one short of the full complement of nine.

Upon the retirement of Commissioners Firme, Tillah and Lardizabal on May 17, 1983, the Commission on Elections was composed of only five members. On March 21, 1983, two new members were appointed by President Marcos, namely: Froilan Bacungan and Ramon H. Felipe Jr. With the retirement of Chairman Santiago and Commissioners Pabalete and Sagadraca on May 17, 1984, Savellano was appointed chairman. Three new members were appointed on July 27, 1985, namely: Commissioners Quirino A. Marquinez, Mangontawar Guro and Mario D. Ortiz. On January 31, 1986, Commissioners Ruben C. Agpalo and Jaime Layosa were appointed to finally complete the required membership of nine.

After the 1986 EDSA People Power Revolution
After the tumultuous February 7, 1986 snap elections and the People Power Revolution, Chairman Savellano and all the commissioners of the  tendered their courtesy resignations which, except those of Commissioners Bacungan and Felipe, were accepted by President Corazon C. Aquino.

On April 11, 1986, Commissioner Felipe was appointed acting chairman. On July 23, 1986, he took his oath of office as permanent chairman, together with Commissioners Leopoldo Africa, Haydee Yorac, Andres Flores, Anacleto Badoy, and Dario Rama as members of the "new" Commission on Elections. On February 15, 1988, Hilario G. Davide Jr. was appointed chairman, with Alfredo E. Abueg Jr., Haydee B. Yorac, Leopoldo L. Africa, Andres R. Flores, Dario C. Rama and Magdara B. Dimaampao as commissioners. Commissioner Haydee B. Yorac was appointed as acting chairman when Hilario G. Davide Jr. was appointed chairman of the Presidential Fact Finding Commission in December 1989, pursuant to Administrative Order No. 146. On June 6, 1991 Christian Monsod was appointed by President Aquino as chairman of the commission to serve the unexpired term of Davide.

When Monsod retired on February 15, 1995, President Fidel V. Ramos appointed Court of Appeals Justice Bernardo Pardo as chairman of the commission. Pardo's term was cut short when he was appointed by President Joseph Estrada as associate justice of the Supreme Court in October 1998. Commissioner Luzviminda Tancangco was appointed acting chairman of the commission.

On January 11, 1999, President Estrada appointed Sandiganbayan Justice Harriet Demetriou as chairman of the commission. After the events of January 17 to 20, 2001 that led to the ouster and resignation of President Estrada from power, Demetriou tendered her courtesy resignation which was accepted by President Gloria Macapagal Arroyo.

On February 19, 2001, President Arroyo appointed Justice Alfredo Benipayo as chairman of the commission. However, the Commission on Appointments did not confirm his appointment due to opposition of some commissioners led by Luzviminda Tancangco. On June 5, 2002, President Arroyo appointed Metropolitan Manila Development Authority chairman and former Mandaluyong mayor Benjamin S. Abalos Sr. to replace Benipayo. On January 26, 2008, Gloria Macapagal Arroyo appointed former Supreme Court associate justice Jose Melo, 77, to replace Chair Abalos. The United Opposition (Koalisyon ng Nagkakaisang Pilipino) opposed Melo's appointment. However, Melo needed to be confirmed by the Commission on Appointments (CA), so Commissioner Romeo A. Brawner was appointed ad interim acting chairman on February 2, 2008, and stayed as chairman until Melo was confirmed by the CA. Melo's ad interim appointment (Congress was not in session) was sent by Malacañang to the Commission on Appointments.

On May 29, 2008, Romeo A. Brawner died from a massive heart attack. Gloria Macapagal Arroyo, on July 2, 2008, appointed former acting judge (Br. 74, RTC, Malabon) Leonardo Leonida and retired justice of the Court of Appeals Lucenito Tagle as commissioners of the Commission on Elections. On November 7, 2008, President Gloria Macapagal Arroyo appointed Armando Velasco as new election commissioner, and reappointed bypassed commissioners Leonardo L. Leonida and Lucenito N. Tagle. Eduardo Ermita stated "Velasco replaced  commissioner and former Iligan City Judge Moslemen Macarambon Jr. whose appointment had been bypassed several times by the Commission on Appointments (CA)."

2007 impeachment complaint
On September 27, 2007, Iloilo Vice Governor Rolex Suplico filed a 69-page impeachment complaint (3:00 p.m.) against COMELEC chairman Benjamin Abalos Sr. before the House of Representatives of the Philippines regarding the ZTE national broadband network (NBN) deal. It was endorsed by Representatives Teofisto Guingona III of Bukidnon and Teodoro Casiño of Bayan Muna (People First), and Zamboanga City Representative Ma. Isabelle Climaco. Affidavits of Romulo Neri and Jose de Venecia III supported the complaint. On October 1, 2007,  chairman Benjamin Abalos Sr. faced with an impending impeachment case, resigned in a press conference. The COMELEC appointed Resurreccion Z. Borra as acting chairman. Abalos stated: "I'm resigning... effective immediately." "However," Abalos added during the news conference, "let not my detractors feast on this declaration. I'm not admitting guilt for any wrongdoing." An impeachment complaint against  chairman Abalos was formally filed before the House of Representatives after Neri, former chief of the National Economic Development Authority (NEDA), accused Abalos of attempting to bribe him.

Organization

The commission proper is the policy-making body composed of the chairman and six commissioners who must be natural-born citizens of the Philippines; at least thirty-five years of age at the time of their appointment; holders of a college degree, with a majority of them, including the chairman, members of the Philippine Bar who have been engaged in the practice of law for at least ten years; and must not have been a candidate for any elective position in the immediate preceding elections. The chairman and the commissioners are appointed by the president, with the consent of the Commission on Appointments and hold office for seven years, without reappointment. Since 1987, the terms start and end on February 2. Among the first appointees in 1987, three members served for seven years (ended in 1994), two others served for five years (ended in 1992), and two others served for three years (ended in 1989).

The chairman acts as the presiding officer and chief executive officer of the commission. Assisting the commission are an executive director and deputies, 17 regional election directors, provincial election supervisors and election officers in cities and municipalities. The  has more than 15,000 employees.

The commissioners exercise quasi-legislative and quasi-judicial functions either en banc or in division. They also perform such other functions as may be assigned by the commission or the chairman.

Current composition

Former members
During the 1935 constitution, the commission was composed of three members, with one chairman and two commissioners, each having nine-year terms with no reappointments. Among the first three members appointed, the first had a nine-year term, the second had a six-year term, and the last had a three-year term, all starting in the commission's reorganization on June 21, 1941, via Commonwealth Act No. 657.

Starting with the 1973 constitution, the commission was composed of nine members, with one chairman and eight commissioners, each having seven-year terms with no reappointments. Among the first nine members appointed, the first three had seven-year terms, the next three had five-year terms, and the last three had three-year terms, all starting in 1973. The commission never reached its full complement of nine members during the operation of the 1973 constitution until January 1986, a few weeks before the People Power Revolution.

Issues and incidents

ZTE broadband contract controversy
In August 2007, Nueva Vizcaya Rep. Carlos Padilla delivered a privilege speech alleging that Comelec chairman Benjamin Abalos brokered for the national broadband network (NBN) project. Padilla claimed that Abalos met with officials of the Chinese firm ZTE Corp., which got the US$329 million contract for the broadband project.

Abalos denied brokering for the National Broadband Network project despite admitting he knew some officials in ZTE Corp. He admitted making four trips to China and playing golf there. He also admitted that ZTE officials, whom he said were his golf buddies, hosted and paid for the trips.

Jose de Venecia III, son of House Speaker Jose de Venecia Jr., alleged that Abalos offered him US$10 million to withdraw his proposal on the NBN project. De Venecia is a majority shareholder of Amsterdam Holdings Inc., a company that submitted an unsolicited proposal on the NBN project. De Venecia also claimed that Abalos asked for money from the ZTE Corp. officials.

Hello Garci scandal

Abalos was mentioned in the "Hello Garci" tape, which refers to the alleged wiretapped conversations where vote rigging in the 2004 elections was discussed by, among others, a woman presumed to be President Gloria Arroyo and a man presumed to be  Commissioner Virgilio Garcillano.

Mega Pacific
Abalos was the  chair when the election body approved a P1.3-billion contract with the Mega Pacific Consortium for the purchase of automated counting machines, which the Supreme Court in January 2004 declared as void because of "clear violation of law and jurisprudence" and "reckless disregard of 's own bidding rules and procedure."

On January 21, 2004, Senator Aquilino Pimentel Jr. filed criminal and administrative charges before the Ombudsman against Abalos and other commissioners in connection with the deal. Abalos described the charges as a "demolition job."

Pimentel accused Abalos and the other commissioners of committing an act of impropriety when they and their wives traveled to Seoul, South Korea to visit the plant of the maker of the counting machines a few months before the bidding for the contract started. Pimentel said he received information that the Korean company paid for the plane tickets and hotel accommodations for the trip.

However, Abalos claimed that the expenses for the trip were paid for out of the P1 million he won in a golf tournament in Wack Wack Golf and Country Club.

On September 27, 2006, the Ombudsman, in a resolution, absolved all respondents involved in the Mega Pacific controversy of all administrative and criminal liabilities "for lack of probable cause." It also reversed its June 28 resolution which contained factual findings that can be used by the House of Representatives to initiate impeachment proceedings against  Commissioner Resureccion Borra.

Website hacking
Just six weeks before the 2016 Philippine general election, the  website was hacked by a group called "Anonymous Philippines" on the night of March 27, 2016. Anonymous Philippines asked the poll body to implement security on Precinct Count Optical Scanners (PCOS)—automated voting machines. Another group calling itself LulzSec Pilipinas, claimed to have hacked 's website, and posted its database on their Facebook account shortly after Anonymous Philippines compromised 's website. These exploits exposed voter data and the vulnerability of both voter registration data and the functionality of their website. LulzSec posts 3 mirror links on their Facebook account that can be downloaded. The incident was considered the biggest private leak data in the Philippine history and leaving millions of registered voters at risk.

The sensitive information, which included the full name, complete address, and passport number of at least 55–70 million Filipino registered voters, was leaked publicly on a website called wehaveyourdata, allegedly created by hacker LulzSec Philippines. Anyone who had access to this website could type the first name, surname, and middle name of the compromised registered voters on the search bar provided and the sensitive information would be revealed. The website was taken down by the NBI on April 22. COMELEC spokesperson James Jimenez warned the public not to use the website, warning this could be a phishing site. On April 21, COMELEC apologized for the privacy attacks by the hackers.

2022 National Elections

Threat of jailing critics 
On April 23, 2022, a few weeks before the 2022 Philippine general election, COMELEC commissioner Rey Bulay threatened with arrest individuals who would publicly state that COMELEC was biased towards a certain candidate or might be involved in election fraud.“Iyon pong nagko-comment ng public opinion na ang Comelec ay may sina-side-an, may kinakampihan, at mandadaya, ako po ay nagwawarning sa inyo, we will not hesitate to call upon the AFP na sa panahong ito ay nasa ilalim ng control ng Comelec para patulan at ipahuli at ipakulong kayo,”

“To those issuing public opinion that Comelec is biased or that it would cause election fraud, I am warning you that we would not hesitate to call upon the Armed Forces of the Philippines, which is now under Comelec control, to round you up and have you jailed”

- Commissioner Rey Bulay said during a press briefing.The statement was made allegedly in support of a different statement by COMELEC Commissioner Socorro Inting who in turn was commenting on a statement released by supporters of then Presidential Candidate and Vice-President Leni Robredo who called for COMELEC to remain nonpartisan for the sake of the elections. Commissioner Inting commented that it was simply unnecessary to call on the COMELEC to hold a “nonpartisan” election. The commissioner also noted how such statements are liable to cast doubt on the legitimacy of the commission and by extension the elections themselves. Local news agency Rappler noted that it was unclear why Commissioner Inting took offense to this statement released by the supporters of Leni Robredo, which simply reminded the commission to hold fair and safe elections.

Several lawmakers and concerned groups slammed the statement by the Comelec. Detained Senator Leila de Lima called the threat by Commissioner Bulay "uncalled for and illegal". She noted that the Armed Force of the Philippines are only allowed to arrest individuals during times of lawless violence while under orders from the Commander-in-Chief. She noted that while COMELEC has expansive powers during an election season, this "does not include the power to use the AFP in stifling criticisms and suppressing free speech”. In a separate statement, House Assistant Minority Leader and party-list Rep. France L. Castro called on COMELEC to withdraw its statement, calling the commission hypersensitive to criticisms thrown at it by the populace. The representative stated that citizens are well within their rights to call for "orderly, peaceful and credible elections”.

Following the backlash, Commissioner Bulay commented that his statement was only a warning, and that he was only reminding people to follow the law.

See also
Election commission
Presidential Electoral Tribunal
Senate Electoral Tribunal
House of Representatives Electoral Tribunal

References

External links

 Official Website of the Philippines Commission on Elections
 Current Members of 
 Past Members of 

Elections in the Philippines
Philippines
Quasi-judicial bodies
Elections
Articles which contain graphical timelines